The following outline is provided as an overview of and topical guide to the Democratic Republic of the Congo:

Democratic Republic of the Congo – country located in Central Africa. The country is extremely rich in natural resources but political instability, a lack of infrastructure and a culture of corruption have historically limited development, extraction and exploitation efforts. Besides the capital, Kinshasa, the country's other largest cities are both mining communities (Lubumbashi and Mbuji-Mayi) and the country's largest exports are raw minerals.

General reference

 Pronunciation: 
 Common English country names: The Democratic Republic of the Congo, Congo-Kinshasa, Zaire
 Official English country name: The Democratic Republic of the Congo
 Adjectives: Congolese, Congo
 Demonym(s):
 ISO country codes: CD, COD, 180
 ISO region codes: See ISO 3166-2:CD
 Internet country code top-level domain: .cd

Geography of the Democratic Republic of the Congo 

Geography of the Democratic Republic of the Congo
 The Democratic Republic of the Congo is: an equatorial megadiverse country
 Location:
 Eastern Hemisphere, on the Equator
 Africa
 Central Africa
 Middle Africa
 Time zones:
 West Africa Time (UTC+01)
 Central Africa Time (UTC+02)
 Extreme points of the Democratic Republic of the Congo
 High:  Margherita Peak 
 Low:  South Atlantic Ocean 0 m
 Land boundaries:  10,730 km
 2,511 km
 2,410 km
 1,930 km
 1,577 km
 765 km
 628 km
 459 km
 233 km
 217 km
 Coastline:  Gulf of Guinea 37 km
 Population of the Democratic Republic of the Congo: 

 Area of the Democratic Republic of the Congo: 
 Atlas of the Democratic Republic of the Congo

Environment of the Democratic Republic of the Congo 

 Climate of the Democratic Republic of the Congo
 Ecoregions in the Democratic Republic of the Congo
 Renewable energy in the Democratic Republic of the Congo
 Protected areas of the Democratic Republic of the Congo
 Biosphere reserves in the Democratic Republic of the Congo
 Wildlife of the Democratic Republic of the Congo
 Fauna of the Democratic Republic of the Congo
 Amphibians of the Democratic Republic of the Congo
 Birds of the Democratic Republic of the Congo
 Mammals of the Democratic Republic of the Congo
 Reptiles of the Democratic Republic of the Congo

Natural geographic features of the Democratic Republic of the Congo 

 Lakes of the Democratic Republic of the Congo
 Mountains of the Democratic Republic of the Congo
 Volcanoes in the Democratic Republic of the Congo
 Rivers of the Democratic Republic of the Congo
 World Heritage Sites in the Democratic Republic of the Congo

Regions of the Democratic Republic of the Congo

Ecoregions of the Democratic Republic of the Congo 

List of ecoregions in the Democratic Republic of the Congo

Administrative divisions of the Democratic Republic of the Congo 

Administrative divisions of the Democratic Republic of the Congo
 Provinces of the Democratic Republic of the Congo
 Territories of the Democratic Republic of the Congo

Provinces of the Democratic Republic of the Congo 

Provinces of the Democratic Republic of the Congo

Territories of the Democratic Republic of the Congo 

Territories of the Democratic Republic of the Congo

Municipalities of the Democratic Republic of the Congo 

 Capital of the Democratic Republic of the Congo: Kinshasa
 Cities of the Democratic Republic of the Congo

Demography of the Democratic Republic of the Congo 

Demographics of the Democratic Republic of the Congo

Government and politics of the Democratic Republic of the Congo 

Politics of the Democratic Republic of the Congo
 Form of government: semi-presidential democratic republic
 Capital of the Democratic Republic of the Congo: Kinshasa
 Elections in the Democratic Republic of the Congo
 Political parties in the Democratic Republic of the Congo

Branches of the government of the Democratic Republic of the Congo 

Government of the Democratic Republic of the Congo

Executive branch of the government of the Democratic Republic of the Congo 
 Head of state: President of the Democratic Republic of the Congo,
 Head of government: Prime Minister of the Democratic Republic of the Congo,

Legislative branch of the government of the Democratic Republic of the Congo 

 Parliament of the Democratic Republic of the Congo (bicameral)
 Upper house: Senate of the Democratic Republic of the Congo
 Lower house: House of Commons of the Democratic Republic of the Congo

Judicial branch of the government of the Democratic Republic of the Congo 

Court system of the Democratic Republic of the Congo

Foreign relations of the Democratic Republic of the Congo 

Foreign relations of the Democratic Republic of the Congo
 Diplomatic missions in the Democratic Republic of the Congo
 Diplomatic missions of the Democratic Republic of the Congo

International organization membership 
The Democratic Republic of the Congo is a member of:

African, Caribbean, and Pacific Group of States (ACP)
African Development Bank Group (AfDB)
African Union (AU)
Common Market for Eastern and Southern Africa (COMESA)
Economic Community of the Great Lakes Countries (CEPGL)
Food and Agriculture Organization (FAO)
Group of 24 (G24)
Group of 77 (G77)
International Atomic Energy Agency (IAEA)
International Bank for Reconstruction and Development (IBRD)
International Civil Aviation Organization (ICAO)
International Criminal Court (ICCt)
International Criminal Police Organization (Interpol)
International Development Association (IDA)
International Federation of Red Cross and Red Crescent Societies (IFRCS)
International Finance Corporation (IFC)
International Fund for Agricultural Development (IFAD)
International Hydrographic Organization (IHO) (suspended)
International Labour Organization (ILO)
International Maritime Organization (IMO)
International Monetary Fund (IMF)
International Olympic Committee (IOC)
International Organization for Migration (IOM)
International Organization for Standardization (ISO)
International Red Cross and Red Crescent Movement (ICRM)

International Telecommunication Union (ITU)
International Telecommunications Satellite Organization (ITSO)
International Trade Union Confederation (ITUC)
Inter-Parliamentary Union (IPU)
Multilateral Investment Guarantee Agency (MIGA)
Nonaligned Movement (NAM)
Organisation internationale de la Francophonie (OIF)
Organisation for the Prohibition of Chemical Weapons (OPCW)
Permanent Court of Arbitration (PCA)
Southern African Development Community (SADC)
United Nations (UN)
United Nations Conference on Trade and Development (UNCTAD)
United Nations Educational, Scientific, and Cultural Organization (UNESCO)
United Nations High Commissioner for Refugees (UNHCR)
United Nations Industrial Development Organization (UNIDO)
Universal Postal Union (UPU)
World Confederation of Labour (WCL)
World Customs Organization (WCO)
World Federation of Trade Unions (WFTU)
World Health Organization (WHO)
World Intellectual Property Organization (WIPO)
World Meteorological Organization (WMO)
World Tourism Organization (UNWTO)
World Trade Organization (WTO)

Law and order in the Democratic Republic of the Congo 

Law of the Democratic Republic of the Congo
 Constitution of the Democratic Republic of the Congo
 Crime in the Democratic Republic of the Congo
 Sexual violence in the Democratic Republic of the Congo
 Human rights in the Democratic Republic of the Congo
 LGBT rights in the Democratic Republic of the Congo
 Freedom of religion in the Democratic Republic of the Congo
 Women in the Democratic Republic of the Congo
 Law enforcement in the Democratic Republic of the Congo

Military of the Democratic Republic of the Congo 

Military of the Democratic Republic of the Congo
 Command
 Commander-in-chief:
 Forces
 Land Forces of the Democratic Republic of the Congo
 Navy of the Democratic Republic of the Congo
 Air Force of the Democratic Republic of the Congo
 Republican Guard of the Democratic Republic of the Congo

Local government in the Democratic Republic of the Congo 

Local government in the Democratic Republic of the Congo

History of the Democratic Republic of the Congo

History by period 
Pre-colonial history

History by region 
History of the Kasai region
History of Katanga
History of Kinshasa

History by subject 
Economic history of the Democratic Republic of the Congo
History of the Jews in the Democratic Republic of the Congo
Postage stamps and postal history of the Democratic Republic of the Congo

Culture of the Democratic Republic of the Congo 

Culture of the Democratic Republic of the Congo
 Cuisine of the Democratic Republic of the Congo
 Languages of the Democratic Republic of the Congo
 Media in the Democratic Republic of the Congo
 National symbols of the Democratic Republic of the Congo
 Coat of arms of the Democratic Republic of the Congo
 Flag of the Democratic Republic of the Congo
 National anthem of the Democratic Republic of the Congo
 People of the Democratic Republic of the Congo
 Prostitution in the Democratic Republic of the Congo
 Public holidays in the Democratic Republic of the Congo
 Religion in the Democratic Republic of the Congo
 Christianity in the Democratic Republic of the Congo
 Hinduism in the Democratic Republic of the Congo
 Islam in the Democratic Republic of the Congo
 Judaism in the Democratic Republic of the Congo

Art in the Democratic Republic of the Congo 
 Cinema of the Democratic Republic of the Congo
 Music of the Democratic Republic of the Congo

Sport in the Democratic Republic of the Congo 

Sport in the Democratic Republic of the Congo
 Football in the Democratic Republic of the Congo
 Rugby union in the Democratic Republic of the Congo
 Democratic Republic of the Congo at the Olympics

Economy and infrastructure of the Democratic Republic of the Congo 

Economy of the Democratic Republic of the Congo
 Economic rank, by nominal GDP (2007): 117th (one hundred and seventeenth)
 Agriculture in the Democratic Republic of the Congo
 Cassava production in the Democratic Republic of the Congo
 Communications in the Democratic Republic of the Congo
 Internet in the Democratic Republic of the Congo
 Companies of the Democratic Republic of the Congo
 Currency of the Democratic Republic of the Congo: Franc
ISO 4217: CDF
 Energy in the Democratic Republic of the Congo
 Health care in the Democratic Republic of the Congo
 Mining in the Democratic Republic of the Congo
 Tourism in the Democratic Republic of the Congo
 Transport in the Democratic Republic of the Congo
 Airports in the Democratic Republic of the Congo
 Rail transport in the Democratic Republic of the Congo

Education in the Democratic Republic of the Congo 

Education in the Democratic Republic of the Congo

Health in the Democratic Republic of the Congo 

Health in the Democratic Republic of the Congo

See also 

Democratic Republic of the Congo
Index of Democratic Republic of the Congo-related articles
List of Democratic Republic of the Congo-related topics
All pages with titles beginning with Democratic Republic of the Congo
All pages with titles beginning with Congo-Kinshasa
All pages with titles containing Democratic Republic of the Congo
All pages with titles containing Congo-Kinshasa
List of international rankings
Member state of the United Nations
Outline of Africa
Outline of geography

References

External links

 BBC country profile
 Democratic Republic of the Congo. The World Factbook. Central Intelligence Agency.
 
 RD Congo (In French and English)
 "Rape of a Nation" by Marcus Bleasdale on MediaStorm

Democratic Republic of the Congo